Joy Irwin is a South African former cricketer who played as a batter. She appeared in three Test matches for South Africa in 1960 and 1961, all against England, scoring 40 runs in her six innings. She played domestic cricket for Durban and Natal.

Career
Irwin, a record-breaking opening batsman for Natal, was selected to play for South Africa women against the touring English women in 1960–61.  In the first tour match, playing for South African XI Women, Irwin scored 5 & 34 opening alongside Barbara Cairncross as the South African team forced a draw after following on.

References

External links
 
 

Living people
Date of birth missing (living people)
Year of birth missing (living people)
Place of birth missing (living people)
South African women cricketers
South Africa women Test cricketers
KwaZulu-Natal Coastal women cricketers